Isabelle Sandy (a pseudonym; 15 June 1884, Cos, Ariège – 8 May 1975) was a French poet, writer and radio presenter, best known for her regionalism. She was awarded the Prix Montyon by the Académie française for Chantal Daunoy. It has been noted that she was one of the few women writers in the interwar period.

Bibliography 
 L'Ève douloureuse, 1912
 Chantal Daunoy, 1917
 Maryla. Roman d'une polonaise, 1922
 Andorra ou Les hommes d’airain, 1923. American edition: Andorra: A Novel, Boston, Houghton Mifflin Company, 1924 (translated by Mathilde Monnier & Florence Donnell White ; introduction by Rudyard Kipling. British edition: Andorra, London, Geoffrey Bles, 1925
 L'homme et la sauvageonne, 1925
 Llivia ou Les cœurs tragiques, 1926. American edition: Wild Heart, Boston, Houghton Mifflin Company, 1926 (translated by Charles Miner Thompson
 Les soutanes vertes, 1927
 Kaali, 1931
 La vierge au collier, 1931
 L'homme qui fabriquait de l'or, 1932
 Un homme à la mer, 1932
 La soutane sanglante, 1935
 L'enchantement, 1938
 Sang et or ou La paix par les femmes, 1945
 Printemps de feul, 1946
 Les grandiose visions d'Anne-Catherine Emmerich, 1948
 La tempête sur l'amour, 1948
 La maison des femmes seules, 1949
 Trencabel, pyrénéen, 1955
 De granit et de pourpre : le Cardinal Saliège, 1957 (with Marguerite Dufaur)
 Je n'ai jamais vu Dieu, 1959
 Montségur temple cathare : son histoire, son message, 1962
 Madonne aux cheveux blancs

References 

1884 births
1975 deaths
People from Ariège (department)
20th-century French novelists
20th-century French women writers